Contenda is a municipality in the state of Paraná in the South Region of Brazil.

Named Potato Capital after the Emperor D. Pedro II visit Lapa City, at 1880. área : 344,8 km².
A healthy country town province of plantation by Curitiba

See also
List of municipalities in Paraná

References

Municipalities in Paraná